This is a list of prisons within Xinjiang region of the People's Republic of China.

Sources

References

Buildings and structures in Xinjiang
Xinjiang